Arnold Piggott  is a Trinidadian politician who served as Minister of Foreign Affairs of Trinidad and Tobago from 29 September 2006 to 7 November 2007. He has also served as "Minister of Works and Transport", "High Commissioner for the Republic of Trinidad and Tobago to Canada" and "Agriculture Minister" during his career.

References 

Trinidad and Tobago politicians
Foreign ministers of Trinidad and Tobago
Agriculture ministers of Trinidad and Tobago
Transport ministers of Trinidad and Tobago